Bryopsidales is an order of green algae, in the class Ulvophyceae.

Characteristics
The thallus is filamentous and much branched and may be packed into a mass. It is coenocytic, having multi-nucleate cells consisting of cytoplasm contained within a cylindrical cell wall. There are no septae and the many discoid chloroplasts, nuclei and other organelles are free to move through the organism. The whole organism may consist of a single cell and in the genus Caulerpa this may be several metres across. In the genus Halimeda, whole seabed meadows may consist of an individual, single-celled organism connected by filamentous threads running through the substrate.

Reproduction
Propagation is normally vegetative from small fragments which grow into new individuals. Under certain conditions sexual reproduction occurs in a process called holocarpy. Almost all of the cytoplasm in the thallus is converted into biflagellate gametes, which are discharged into the sea through papillae. After fertilisation, the zygote becomes a protonema and this in turn develops into a new thallus.

References

 
Chlorophyta orders